Galtrigill is a largely abandoned crofting township on the far north end of the east side of the Duirinish peninsula on the Isle of Skye, and is in the Scottish council area of Highland.

The villages of Borreraig, Uig and Totaig are located directly south. The Stone of Manners lies north of Galtrigill, and is the only one known to exist on the Isle of Skye.

References

Populated places in the Isle of Skye